Kannezhuthi Pottum Thottu is a 1999 Indian Malayalam-language drama film, written and directed by T. K. Rajeev Kumar, starring Manju Warrier, Thilakan, Biju Menon, Abbas and Kalabhavan Mani. The soundtrack was composed by M. G. Radhakrishnan while Sharreth composed the film score; Mohanlal had sung a song Kaithappoovin in the film. Manju Warrier received a National Film Award - Special Mention for her performance.

Synopsis
A young woman named Bhadra (Manju Warrier) wants to take revenge against a landlord, Natesan (Thilakan), who murdered her parents 15 years earlier. She gets a work at Natesan's land. She is taught work by the other female workers there. Natesan's son(Biju Menon) who has an eye on Bhadra, holds her. She gets furious but her workmates calm her. One fine day she notices that a man, chindan who is mentally ill (Kalabhavan Mani) is ill-treated. She befriends him.

That night, the eldest worker narrates a story about a man who gave his life for the land. It was a lie setup by Natesan to hide his killing of Bhadra's father. She always goes to the spot where her father was buried alive.

Bhadra then meets Rosakutty( Kannur Sreelatha ) who now works for Uthaman( Natesan's son), seducing him. Bhadra was so angry on her and tries to kill her. But she won't due to her attachment to Rosa.

Bhadra falls in love with Moosakutty (Abbas), a bangle seller and fisherman whose father was also murdered by Natesan.

Bhadra remembers the past. Her father was a leader of a trade union and they had protested against the landlord ( Natesan ) for increasing the wages. Her father ( Siddique ) and her mother were very fond of Bhadra. Natesan had an eye on Bhadra's mother. So he kills his father and buries him alive. He then makes up a story and says that it should be said like a folk lore. Bhadra's mother comes running hearing the news. Natesan tries to grab her. But she runs along with Bhadra. Bhadra's mother gives Bhadra a sickle and says to run away and revenge Natesan. Bhadra runs away and sees from a distance that her mother had poured kerosene and burned herself alive. She then lights a lamp at the spot every night.

Rosakutty is killed by Uthaman. Bhadra now secures a job in Natesan's house as a help and she also never misses any opportunity to kill Natesan. Once Natesan's wife asks the Namboodiri about her husband's health and he says there is an issue. He also says that theeyattu must be done to appease the Goddess.

Theyyattu is being done. Many women perform mudiyattam as to appease the Goddess and secure health. Chindan points a woman to Bhadra and says that this woman is being married to Uthaman. She is revengous and she seeks blessings of Goddess. The Kali comes and gives some kuri. She prays to the Goddess and applies it on her forehead. She goes to the place where women are appeasing the goddess by performing mudiyattam. She goes there and she unwraps her long hair. She then prays to the goddess and swings it along with the beats, appeasing the goddess.  She begins her plan next day.

She acts as if she is interested in Natesan. She always tries to make Natesan attracted to her. She also seduces Uthaman. Both son and father become arch enemies in the name of Bhadra. Bhadra invites both to the place where her father was murdered and to have her.

Natesan comes first then Uthaman comes. A brawl broke up between two, it rains and both slip into the field. Bhadra breaks open the Mada and she watches all along. Due to the winds, a power cable comes down into the water. Uthaman kills Natesan, just as Bhadra had planned, but he is electrocuted to death by that wire.

All subsides. Everyone is now well and at last Bhadra marries Moosakutty.

Cast
Manju Warrier as Bhadra / Gowri
Thilakan as Ettuveettil Natesan Muthalali
Biju Menon as Uthaman (Kochu Muthalali)
Abbas as Moosakutty (voice dubbed by Krishnachandran)
Kalabhavan Mani as Chindan 
Kaviyoor Renuka as Sarojini, Natesan Muthalali's wife and Uthaman's mother
Siddique as Chandrappan
Maniyanpilla Raju as Mulaku
Ravi Vallathol as Chackochi
Kunchan as Natesan's Helper
Poojappura Ravi as Vaidyar
Baby Krishna as childhood of Bhadra/Gowri
Kannur Sreelatha as Rosakutty
Kanakalatha as Kanakam
Bhagyashree as Gowri
Poojappura Radha Krishnan
Kuttyedathi Vilasini
Kozhikode Sarada 
Bobby Kottarakkara

Production
This is the first Malayalam movie done fully in Avid post-production design, edited in Media Composer, dubbed, re-recorded and mixed in Avid Audio Vision. After this film Manju Warrier took a sabbatical to marry Dileep and start a family life.

Soundtrack
The songs were composed by M. G. Radhakrishnan for the lyrics of Kavalam Narayana Panicker. The film score was composed by Sharreth. Although Mohanlal has not acted in the film, he sang the song "Kaithappoovin" with K. S. Chithra.

Accolades
National Film Awards
 Special Jury Award - Manju Warrier

Asianet Film Awards
 Best Actress - Manju Warrier
 Best Supporting Actor - Biju Menon

Reception 
A critic from Deccan Herald wrote that "Some good songs and excellent acting make it worth your time". A critic from The New Indian Express wrote "at a time when the matriarchal system and the elevated female status it implies is the biggest joke in Kerala, this movie makes you want to stand up and cheer for those women who thumb their broken noses at the status quo".

References

External links
 

1999 films
1990s Malayalam-language films
Films scored by M. G. Radhakrishnan
1999 crime drama films
Indian films about revenge
Films directed by T. K. Rajeev Kumar
1999 drama films
Indian crime drama films